Chris "Casper" Kelly is an American writer, television director, and producer.

Career

Kelly is the co-creator of the Adult Swim live-action series Your Pretty Face Is Going to Hell, the Adult Swim animated series Stroker and Hoop, and the Adult Swim Infomercials episode Too Many Cooks, which he also directed. Too Many Cooks was released online and went viral, amassing over two million views within five days of its release. He also co-directed and co-wrote another Infomercials episode in 2018 titled Final Deployment 4: Queen Battle Walkthrough which subverts livestreaming gaming culture. He has written episodes of Squidbillies, Harvey Birdman, Attorney at Law, Aqua Teen Hunger Force, and Nickelodeon's CatDog.

He is also a fiction writer. His book, More Stories About Spaceships and Cancer, a collection of short stories, was published in 2012. His short story, The Sensitive Person's Joke Book, was published in the web literary magazine Necessary Fiction.

In 2022, he wrote and directed the horror film Adult Swim Yule Log also known as The Fireplace, which premiered on Adult Swim on December 11.

References

External links

Place of birth missing (living people)
Year of birth missing (living people)
Living people
American television writers
American television directors
American television producers